South Axholme Academy is an academy school in Epworth, in the Isle of Axholme area of North Lincolnshire, England.

The school is on the A161, next to Epworth Leisure Centre, and is in the North Lincolnshire Local education authority. South Axholme School Trust is operated by the school itself, the University of Lincoln, Bishop Grosseteste University and Lincolnshire Co-operative.

History

Secondary modern school
The school was opened in January 1961 by Lindsey County Council. It cost £140,000, and had nine classrooms with 350 children. It was considered being named the John Wesley Secondary School.

From September 1964, Epworth children would travel to Crowle for nursing training, and Crowle children (North Axholme Secondary School, which opened in November 1957) would travel to Epworth for commerce and metalwork, and would work with North Lindsey Technical College

Comprehensive
In 1974 it became under Humberside Education Committee, and in 1996 under North Lincolnshire LEA. Initially it was Epworth Comprehensive School, and afterwards, South Axholme Comprehensive School. In 2000 it became South Axholme Community School with Arts Technology College status.

In September 2010 it gained foundation school status - South Axholme, like many foundation schools (the remnants of grant-maintained schools) belong to a trust, as defined by the School Standards and Framework Act 1998. In December 2011 the school gained academy status. It was then renamed South Axholme Academy.

Catchment area
Pupils closer to Scunthorpe attend the John Leggott College after 16 years of age. Grammar school education is available in Gainsborough (West Lindsey), which slightly alters South Axholme's intake of pupils. The school attracts those pupils preferring not to be educated in Scunthorpe. It receives pupils from outside its catchment area, including the Metropolitan Borough of Doncaster and the Bassetlaw District of North Nottinghamshire.

Curriculum
Sport is emphasised in the curriculum, the school having sports teams. It gets good results at GCSE, and in 2010 received the second best GCSE results in North Lincolnshire.

School extra-curricular activity includes an orchestra. Annual carol services are held at the Wesley Memorial Methodist Church in Epworth. The school had previously entered national film-making competitions.

Notable alumni
 Erica Nockalls, violinist
 Sheridan Smith – actress

References

External links
 North Lincolnshire Council
 EduBase

1961 establishments in England
Academies in the Borough of North Lincolnshire
Educational institutions established in 1961
Secondary schools in the Borough of North Lincolnshire